The Man in the Iron Mask (French ; died 19 November 1703) was an unidentified prisoner of state during the reign of King Louis XIV of France (1643–1715). Warranted for arrest on 28 July 1669 under the pseudonym of "Eustache Dauger", he was incarcerated on 24 August and held for 34 years in the custody of the same jailer, in four successive French prisons, including the Bastille. When he died there on 19 November 1703, his inhumation certificate bore the pseudonym of "Marchioly".

The true identity of this prisoner remains a mystery, even though it has been extensively debated by historians, and various theories have been expounded in numerous books and articles over the last three centuries. The ordeal of this prisoner has also been the subject of fictional works such as novels, poems, plays and films.

Selected list of historical candidates  
The following is an incomplete list of individuals identified by historians as possible candidates for the Man in the Iron Mask. To be included in this list, the candidate must have been proposed or discussed in a published work.

The list is initially organized in chronological order of publication date, with sortable columns, as follows:

 Year – the publication year of the work proposing the candidate (sortable column)
 Candidate – the person proposed as a candidate (sortable column) 
 Vital dates – the candidate's dates of birth and death, "Unknown", or blank for imaginary candidates (sortable column)
 Notes – supplementary details about the candidate (sortable column)
 Author(s) – the name(s) of the author(s) who proposed, or published documents on, the candidate (sortable column)
 Ref. – one or more references to works where the candidate was proposed or discussed (this column is not sortable).

References

Citations

Sources

Books

Conference proceedings

Newspapers 

 
 
 
 

Man in the Iron Mask
Candidates for the Man in the Iron Mask
Candidates for the Man in the Iron Mask